Hatton railway station co-served the town of Carnoustie, in the historical county of Forfarshire, Scotland, from 1831 to 1865 on the Dundee and Newtyle Railway.

History 
The station was opened on 16 December 1831 by the Dundee and Newtyle Railway. The services were initially horse-drawn but steam locomotives were introduced on the line in 1833. The station closed in October 1865.

References 

Disused railway stations in Angus, Scotland
Railway stations in Great Britain opened in 1831
Railway stations in Great Britain closed in 1865
1831 establishments in Scotland
1865 disestablishments in Scotland